Pannir Selvam a/l Pranthaman (born 31 July 1987) is a Malaysian drug trafficker who was convicted of trafficking 51.84g of heroin at Woodlands Checkpoint in September 2014. Pannir, who was not certified as a drug courier, was sentenced to death in Singapore for his crime in May 2017. After his appeal was dismissed in February 2018, Pannir and his family submitted various clemency petitions, which were all rejected on 17 May 2019.

Pannir was originally scheduled to hang on 24 May 2019, but Pannir managed to postpone his execution pending a last-minute appeal to challenge the decision to not pardon him and also the prosecution's decision to not certify him as a courier. This appeal ended in failure in February 2020, and also in November 2021. and Pannir is currently on death row, awaiting his next date of execution, which was pending confirmation and yet delayed due to the COVID-19 pandemic in Singapore, which first emerged since January 2020.

Early life
Born on 31 July 1987 in Ipoh, Malaysia, Pannir Selvam a/l Pranthaman was the third child out of six children in an ethnic Indian family. He has an older brother and sister, two younger brothers and a younger sister, and all members of the family were very close to each other. Pannir's father Pranthaman Rajoo was a lorry driver and church pastor, while Pannir's mother Saratha Rajoo was a housewife. Being a Christian by birth, Pannir was educated at the Anglo-Chinese School in Ipoh. He was known to be enthusiastic in school sports and had represented his school in some official sport events. Yet, Pannir did not have a lot of friends in school. At age 17, Pannir graduated from secondary school after he completed his final-year examinations, known as Sijil Pelajaran Malaysia (SPM) in Malaysia.

According to an official website detailing his early life and case, after completing his schooling, Pannir worked as a warehouse assistant at Panca Estetik Enterprise. His colleagues described him as a hardworking and adept young man; his capability at work earned him his first promotion within three months of joining his first job. During his free time, Pannir loved music and had a hobby of playing drums, which he incorporated as a member of the church band aside from his prayers at the church. His favourite artistes are Tupac Shakur and Malique. Pannir was described to be a kind person who helped those in need and was loving towards his family despite being slightly hot-headed.

In 2010, Pannir moved to Singapore where he took up a job as a private security officer. He later became enrolled at Stamford American International School (SAIS) as a part-time student in June 2013 to further his studies at the same time. Pannir also became a member of Singapore Heart Foundation and MSQ Singapore. He also maintained contact with his family while in Singapore, and would still visit them once in a while. He also financed one of his sisters' university education with his salary from his job in Singapore. Two of his sisters were university graduates on scholarships; one of his brothers was studying for his Masters in university as well.

Trafficking of heroin and arrest

Capture and trial
On 3 September 2014, 27-year-old Pannir Selvam Pranthaman was arrested at Woodlands Checkpoint, as he was discovered carrying heroin in his possession while entering Singapore. The total amount of heroin found on Pannir was 51.84g. Under the Misuse of Drugs Act, if anyone was discovered to be illegally trafficking at least 15g of heroin at the time of his or her arrest, he or she will face the gallows in Singapore. Pannir was thus in line for the death penalty in Singapore. He was in remand for two to three years before his trial began. The news of Pannir's arrest brought shock to Pannir's family, who did not notice anything amiss even though they knew he gambled, smoked and drank sometimes while in Singapore.

During his trial in the High Court, Pannir tried to mount a defence that he was merely a drug mule who acted on the orders of one "Anand" who offered him the job after he was feeling down from losing huge sums of money to gambling. Anand told him that he should pass the drugs to one person called "Jimmy" (whose real name was Zamri Mohd Tahir), and promised that the proceeds were high and promising, which could discharge his financial losses. He claimed that he did not know what are the contents he was delivering, and presumed them to be sex medicine or aphrodisiac. The defence tried to argue that Pannir was not aware that it was heroin he was transporting and hence he had rebutted the presumption that he had the knowledge that he was transporting restricted drugs, to which the prosecution argued otherwise based on Pannir’s admission that he knew he was carrying the drugs and the inconsistencies of his statements and testimony.

Even though Pannir was acknowledged to be a drug mule, however, the prosecution did not issue a certificate of substantive assistance as he was not found to be substantively assisting the authorities in disrupting drug trafficking activities. Should he be certified so, Pannir would not face death and instead he would receive life imprisonment with caning up to 15 strokes. His mental responsibility was not impaired according to psychiatric assessments at the time of the offence, which would not make Pannir eligible for life imprisonment either.

On 2 May 2017, Pannir was found guilty of drug trafficking and his defence was not accepted by the High Court’s judge Lee Seiu Kin, who found that he failed to rebut the presumption of him having knowledge about the drugs. Since he was not certified as a courier, and he was also not assessed to be suffering from any mental illnesses at the time of the offence, the High Court meted out the one and only sentence available for Pannir relating to his conviction, which was the mandatory death penalty.

Appeal and clemency plea
The Court of Appeal later heard Pannir’s appeal, but they affirmed the High Court’s verdict and dismissed the appeal on 9 February 2018. This left Pannir with one final avenue of appeal, which was to appeal to the President of Singapore for clemency. If he was successful, Pannir would have his death sentence commuted to life imprisonment. The last time when clemency was granted in Singapore was in 1998, when 19-year-old Mathavakannan Kalimuthu was pardoned from execution despite being sentenced to hang for murdering a gangster in 1996. Mathavakannan was paroled and released in 2012 after serving 16 years out of his life sentence due to good behaviour.

Pannir stated in his clemency appeal that he sincerely regretted his actions, and he hoped that he could live so that he could devote himself to Christianity and use his religion to seek redemption and to teach others to not follow in his footsteps. He also implored the President of Singapore to show mercy to drug traffickers on death row who regretted their crimes to give them chances to be rehabilitated and could get chances to educate the rest of the generation about the risks of drugs and consequences.

On 17 May 2019, the family of Pannir was informed that President Halimah Yacob, on the advice of the Cabinet, decided to turn down Pannir’s appeal for clemency, which finalized his death sentence and he will hang in a short time.

Stay of execution
Shortly after the clemency appeal was declined, an execution order was soon finalized for 31-year-old Pannir Selvam Pranthaman. The death warrant, which was issued to Pannir's family on 17 May 2019, informed them that Pannir would be hanged on 24 May 2019 a week later. Pannir then applied to delay his execution as he wanted to challenge the clemency outcome in his case. Liew Vui Keong, then Malaysia's law minister, stepped forward to provide help to Pannir's family and even wrote to the Singapore authorities with hopes to convince them to commute Pannir's death sentence to life imprisonment.

On 23 May 2019, a day before he was due to hang, the Court of Appeal granted Pannir a stay of execution. Two local criminal lawyers Too Xing Ji and Lee Ji En helped take on his case. When granting the stay of execution, the Court of Appeal noted that Pannir was told of the rejection for clemency and his execution date just one week in advance, not leaving him much time to obtain legal advice on what options he has to challenge the rejection. Pannir also filed another procedural application, which was rejected. Pannir's family themselves, at the mean time, tried to conduct their own investigations to obtain information and search for the people who allegedly gave Pannir the orders to import the drugs.

Pannir's second appeal
When his appeal was heard in the High Court, Pannir Selvam Pranthaman, through his lawyers, argued that he should be certified as a courier by the Attorney General of Singapore given that he had given information about his alleged boss Zamri Mohd Tahir, who was arrested on 11 October 2014 (a month later than Pannir), which would have been substantive assistance based on the requirements of being a courier but was not duly considered by the prosecution, and the Cabinet did not consider it when deciding to advise the President on whether to pardon Pannir or not.

Besides, the rejection of Pannir’s plea took place on 7 May, yet the outcome was only revealed ten days later, and since it was revealed on the same day his execution warrant and date was given, it may have contained improper conduct about the proceedings, since the outcome was not revealed earlier and the execution was scheduled just seven days after the letters were sent, which should not be acceptable. Zamri was also not called as a witness to which his evidence would have corroborated Pannir’s assertion that he was just a drug mule under Zamri’s orders. The overall arguments indicated that it was unconstitutional to send Pannir to the gallows and it would have been a breach of his rights to life.

However, the prosecution argued that the application of Pannir was unmeritorious, as it was clear from the evidence that, prior to 7 May 2019, the Cabinet had advised the President that the law should be allowed to take its course in relation to Pannir. The post-dated letters should not be sufficient to challenge the decision to not grant clemency to Pannir. The leader of the prosecution Francis Ng noted that the use of such letters was not a legal requirement but issued as a matter of administration to notify interested persons of the outcome of the clemency process. Besides, Pannir only identified Zamri long after he was arrested, and in prosecuting Zamri, the prosecution did not have the assistance of the information from Pannir to allow them to successfully convict Zamri and send him to death row.

On 12 February 2020, Pannir’s appeal was dismissed by judge See Kee Oon of the High Court. Pannir stated he would appeal against the appeal’s dismissal to the Court of Appeal, but on 26 November 2021, more than 19 months later, Pannir's appeal was dismissed by the Court of Appeal of Singapore, which affirmed the fact that Pannir had not given the authorities any substantive assistance regarding Zamri's arrest.

Shortly after the 2021 appeal verdict hearing, Pannir's lawyer Too Xing Ji told reporters that Pannir currently have not given any instructions on whether he will issue any more legal applications in his case. The lawyer reportedly shed tears over the verdict in Pannir's appeal. Pannir's family were also saddened at the verdict, but Pannir remains positive despite the disheartening outcome. Pannir's sister Angelia later submitted an appeal to Singapore to ask for mercy on the lives of her brother and another drug trafficker Nagaenthran K. Dharmalingam, who was also facing imminent execution after he exhausted all his avenues of appeal.

Subsequent developments

Responses from Malaysia
In light of Pannir Selvam Pranthaman's scheduled execution and its subsequent postponement, there were increasing concerns that Singapore was giving unfair treatment to Malaysians arrested and sentenced to death row and execution for drug offences, as there were rising numbers of Malaysians among the drug traffickers executed in recent years. In response to these concerns, Singapore's law minister K Shanmugam argued that there is no inequality in treating foreigners and locals under the law for drug trafficking. He said the majority of Singaporeans favour the death penalty and it would be good for both sides if drug traffickers were caught by Malaysian authorities, as they could be dealt with according to Malaysia’s laws (which also legalises execution for drug trafficking) and not have to worry about Singapore’s capital punishment. Shanmugam emphasised that there should be no special treatment to Malaysian death row prisoners as it would undermine the integrity of Singapore's law.

In July 2019, there are circulations of letters being alleged to be written by Pannir on the internet, which was denied by the Singapore Prison Service, who clarified that Pannir had earlier stated he did not write them, and it seemed that these letters were made up to orchestrate a campaign to further pressurise Singapore to spare Pannir's life. This was not accepted by N. Surendran, a Malaysian human rights lawyer who represented Pannir's family. The Attorney General's Chambers (AGC) also denied another allegation that they sent Surendran a threatening letter in relation to Pannir's case.

Poetry and writing career
During the time he was on death row, Pannir began to pen down poems and song lyrics. Two of his song lyric works were being accepted by some Malaysian musicians who make new songs based on these lyrics. Pannir’s first song "Arah Tuju", which was sang by Malaysian rapper Santesh Kumar and released in April 2021, highlighted the plight of death row inmates and called for forgiveness and mercy. The second song "Bukan Sekadar Hikayat", which was composed and sang by Malaysian rapper Samson Thomas (stage name Saint TFC) before its release in September 2021, was a tribute to Pannir’s home country Malaysia and also to those who fought and made sacrifices for Malaysia over these past decades. The singers of both songs have expressed in the Malaysian news that they felt emotional about Pannir's lyrics which detailed his own emotions and they also got to view the issue of the death penalty from different perspectives.  A third song penned by Pannir, titled "Di Sebalik Pintu Besi", was released in July 2022, with hip-hop artist Kidd Santhe and veteran singer Dj Dave collaborating with each other to produce it. He also contributed a poem to celebrate International Women's Day in March 2022.

Pannir also wrote about his life on death row at Changi Prison and the impact it has on all the convicts, including him, who were awaiting their executions. On 27 April 2022, when drug trafficker Nagaenthran K. Dharmalingam was hanged at dawn, Pannir penned a poem titled Death Row Literature and dedicated it to Nagaenthran and mourned his death.

Case impact on Pannir's family
Since 2020, due to the COVID-19 pandemic in Singapore, Pannir's family were unable to travel to Singapore to visit him while Pannir was on death row. While they acknowledged that Pannir was truly guilty and should be punished, Pannir's family also continued their search for new evidence, some of which they later provided to the authorities, to assist in Pannir's case in order to reopen his case and also rake up any possibilities for him to be spared the gallows and instead receive life imprisonment. Pannir also expressed to his sister that he wished that he can die in Malaysia, the country where he was born and grew up in and loved, and he did not want to face death in Singapore.

Meanwhile, not only do Pannir’s case receive international and local attention, it has an impact on the future of two of his siblings: his elder sister Sangkari and one of his younger sisters Angelia, having experienced their brother’s case and its toll on their family, decided to become anti-death penalty activists in hope of bringing about more awareness about the death penalty and advocate for its abolition, as well as to ask for mercy on other death row convicts to give them second chances for rehabilitation and redemption. Sangkari was one of the people asking for mercy on behalf of drug trafficker Syed Suhail Syed Zin who was originally set to be hanged on 18 September 2020 before it was postponed due to a last-minute appeal to delay his execution. Suhail, who was sentenced in 2015 for trafficking 38.84g of heroin, lost his appeal in February and August 2021 respectively and is currently on death row pending execution.

Angelia, who became the founder and later president of non-governmental organisation (NGO) Sebaran Kasih, was one of those who pleaded to the Singapore government to commute the death sentence of Nagaenthran K. Dharmalingam, who was convicted of importing over 42g of heroin in 2009, when the Singapore Prison Service informed Nagaenthran's mother that her eldest son will be executed on 10 November 2021. Nagaenthran's execution was suspended for five months due to an appeal and COVID-19 infection, and he was executed on 27 April 2022 after losing his final appeal. Angelia also made efforts to raise awareness about the death penalty, including a talk on 29 July 2022 when she promoted her brother's newest musical work and spoke up about the death penalty. She also planned to start a funding initiative titled Kitchen For Hope to provide financial help to the families of death-row inmates who were the sole breadwinners.

Lawsuit against Attorney-General
Pannir became one of the 24 death row prisoners to file a lawsuit against the Attorney-General of Singapore, and they brought forward claims that there were miscarriages of justice and unfairness in their cases as they were denied their access to legal counsel and had their preparations of appeal hindered, which made some inmates having to represent themselves in court without counsel to argue in their appeals. They stated that the court orders and fines made against lawyers for making baseless appeals had made lawyers fearful of reprisals from the courts and thus turned down the death row cases. However, on 3 August 2022, Pannir and the 23 others lost the lawsuit after the courts ruled that the allegations were not true, given that the lawyers had perfectly valid and legitimate reasons to not take up cases and cannot turn them down merely based on the court orders for the lawyers who had disciplinary problems and made baseless appeals.

Current status
Since the loss of his appeal in November 2021, Pannir remains incarcerated on death row at Changi Prison, awaiting his execution.

Pannir's sister Angelia Pranthaman told a Malaysian newspaper in May 2022 that the family faced massive financial burden due to the legal costs of Pannir's appeals and the regular need to travel from Malaysia to Singapore, and they hoped that Pannir and the other Malaysians on death row can be allowed to return to Malaysia to continue serving their remaining time on death row before their executions, so as to help themselves and other families to avoid having to continue bearing the travel and legal expenses. Also, Angelia revealed that ever since the execution of Nagaenthran K. Dharmalingam in April 2022, Pannir and the other Malaysian prisoners were uneasy and uncomfortable about their imminent fates since the gallows was located nearby their death row cells in the same block. In another news update in February 2023, Angelia also added that she had to save up from her insurance agent job and depend on other family members to afford the expenses her regular trips to Singapore to visit Pannir at Changi Prison, and would also help Pannir to pass on messages from the other Malaysian death row prisoners to their families who cannot visit them due to financial or health reasons. She was also worried that with the newly-enacted Foreign Influence (Countermeasures) Act (FICA), she would be prosecuted for being part of the foreign interference that attempted to meddle in Singapore's current affairs relating to the death penalty, which came under strong international condemnation for their executions of 11 drug criminals in 2022.

It was revealed by Law Minister K. Shanmugam on 3 September 2022 that after the executions of Kalwant Singh Jogindar Singh and Nagaenthran K. Dharmalingam, there were ten Malaysians left on death row, and all of these remaining Malaysians are currently appealing for clemency. Being one of them, Pannir would not be facing execution in the mean time until he receives news of the outcome of his clemency appeal.

See also
 Yong Vui Kong
 Cheong Chun Yin
 Van Tuong Nguyen
 Gobi Avedian
 Nagaenthran K. Dharmalingam
 Abdul Kahar Othman
 Datchinamurthy Kataiah
 Capital punishment in Singapore
 Misuse of Drugs Act (Singapore)
 List of major crimes in Singapore (before 2000)
 List of major crimes in Singapore (2000–present)

Notes

References

Capital punishment in Singapore
Malaysian drug traffickers
Malaysian criminals
1987 births
Malaysian people of Indian descent
Living people
People from Perak
Malaysian Christians